Elledge is a surname. Notable people with the surname include:

James Homer Elledge (1942–2001), American murderer
Jimmy Elledge (1943–2012), American country musician
Jacqueline Elledge (born 1937), English cricketer
Seth Elledge (born 1996), American baseball player